Kavali revenue division (or Kavali division) is an administrative division in the Nellore district of the Indian state of Andhra Pradesh. It is one of the 4 revenue divisions in the district with 10 mandals under its administration. The divisional headquarters are located at Nellore city.

Administration 
The mandals administered under the revenue division are:

See also 
List of revenue divisions in Andhra Pradesh
List of mandals in Andhra Pradesh

References 

Revenue divisions in Nellore district